Chignall St James is a village and former civil parish, now in the parish of Chignall, in the Chelmsford district in Essex, England. The village is situated 3½ miles northwest by west from the county town of Chelmsford. In 1881 the parish had a population of 224. On 24 March 1888 the parish was abolished to form Chignall, parts also went to Broomfield and Writtle.

The spelling of the village name is open to discussion. Sometimes it is spelt as "Chignall St James" at other times, as "Chignal St James" or "Chignal Saint James".

Businesses providing employment in the area include Ashdown Engineering, Gardening Express and local farms.

The area once included a Roman villa, the site of which was discovered in the 1970s. Originally the village was a settlement for farmers and their labour force that worked the land, but as mechanisation took over the farming population left. The village is now partly a commuter settlement, and partly resident to remaining agricultural workers and retired people.

The village had a public house, The Three Elms, thought to be over 500 years old, which has passed through many hands over the years, but has proved to be unviable financially. The last incumbents took over in March 2019, but closed again in September 2019, after the premises had been closed for an extended period prior to this. The owners of the property have attempted to sell it on the open market since this time, but to date a new owner can not be found since demand and patronage of such premises has declined over the years. 

In 2009 there was a planning proposal to create a quarry close by to the village, but this was turned down by the planning authorities.

Notable village landmarks include an old brick-built farm barn with a dove-cote thought to be the oldest and only example of its type in Essex, an old red brick school (now a dwelling), the former church, and the Old Rectory.

References

External links

 Chignal Parish Council Web Site
 Ashdown Engineering
 Gardening Express

Villages in Essex
Former civil parishes in Essex